Antliodus is an extinct genus of petalodont shark from the Carboniferous Period. It is known from the Mississippian of the United States, Britain, and Belgium Though many species have been reported in the past, a lack of recent revisions means some may be dubious.

References

Petalodontiformes
Prehistoric cartilaginous fish genera
Fossil taxa described in 1866